Leonard Hachborn (born September 9, 1961) is a Canadian former professional ice hockey player. He played in the National Hockey League (NHL) with the Philadelphia Flyers and Los Angeles Kings. Hachborn grew up playing hockey with his childhood friend Wayne Gretzky. As a youth, he played in the 1974 Quebec International Pee-Wee Hockey Tournament with a minor ice hockey team from Brantford.

References

External links
 

1961 births
Living people
Ayr Bruins players
Binghamton Rangers players
Bolzano HC players
Brantford Alexanders players
Canadian ice hockey centres
Detroit Vipers players
Grand Rapids Griffins players
HDD Olimpija Ljubljana players
Heilbronner EC players
Hershey Bears players
Houston Aeros (1994–2013) players
Innsbrucker EV players
Krefeld Pinguine players
Los Angeles Kings players
Maine Mariners players
New Haven Nighthawks players
Philadelphia Flyers draft picks
Philadelphia Flyers players
Phoenix Mustangs players
Rögle BK players
San Diego Gulls (IHL) players
San Diego Gulls (WCHL) players
Springfield Falcons players
Springfield Indians players
ZSC Lions players
Ice hockey people from Ontario
Sportspeople from Brantford
New England Stingers players
Canadian expatriate ice hockey players in Scotland
Canadian expatriate ice hockey players in Slovenia
Canadian expatriate ice hockey players in Italy
Canadian expatriate ice hockey players in Germany
Canadian expatriate ice hockey players in Switzerland
Canadian expatriate ice hockey players in Sweden